This article contains a list of new French communes created in 2019, this is to say a list of new French communes for which prefectural decrees pronouncing their creation defined a date of creation between 1 January 2019 and 31 December 2019.

This list contains 241 new communes regrouping 630 previous communes.

Legislative history 
The law no 2010-1563 of 16 December 2010 to reform local authorities replaced the previous regime of merging communes defined in the "Marcellin" law of 16 July 1971 with a renewed consolidation procedure, resulting in the creation of a "new commune". It was supplemented in 2015 by a new law no 2015-292 of 16 March 2015 relating to the improvement of the regime of the new commune, for strong and lively communes, setting up temporary financial incentives in order to promote the creation of new municipalities before 1 January 2019.

Enumeration

Number of new communes created in 2019 
238 new communes were created on 1 January 2019. They regrouped 624 former communes. 2 new communes were created on 28 February 2019. They regrouped 4 former communes, while 1 more new commune was created on 1 March 2019 regrouping 2 former communes.

Total number of communes in France 
On 1 March 2019, the French Republic counted 34,967 communes, of which 34,838 are located in metropolitan France and 129 in overseas departments and regions.

Detailed list 
Article L. 2113-6 of the general code of local and regional authorities (CGCT) specifies that "the decree of the representative of the State in the department pronouncing the creation of the new municipality determines the name of the new municipality, if necessary in view of the opinions issued by the municipal councils, fixes the date of creation and in full, in as needed, the terms". The following table presents these indicators for each of the new communes created in 2019: name, date of the prefectural decree announcing its creation, date of creation and multiple modalities (existence of delegated communities, seat of the commune), or complementary information (population).

References

See also

Related articles 

 List of new French commune projects
 List of new French communes created in 2015
 List of new French communes created in 2016
 List of new French communes created in 2017
 List of new French communes created in 2018
 List of new French communes created in 2021
 List of new French communes created in 2022

Lists of new French communes
2019 in France
Populated places established in 2019
2019 establishments in France